Muhammad Jamil Bayyuhum was an Arab-Lebanese historian, politician, writer and reformist advocate. He is the author of dozens of books, articles, and historical, intellectual and political writings. He worked for the independence of Syria and Lebanon, he defended the Arabism of Palestine, and he called women liberation. He is considered one of the pioneers of the political, social and intellectual renaissance in Lebanon and in the Arab world.

Beginnings 
Muhammad Jamil bin Muhammad Mustafa bin Hussein Bayhum Al-Itani, was born in Beirut and died there. His lineage goes back to the Itani family, one of the ancient Beirut families that trace their origins back to Morocco. The Beyhem family has been active in political, social and economic activities. Ibrahim Beyhem Pasha was an Amir (prince), and Sultan Suleiman Al qanuni (the Magnificent) appointed him to command the Ottoman fleet, then he became the Grand Vizier in the year 1522 AD. Najib Beyhem Al-Itani also had close ties with Pope Lewn and met him in a private meeting. Hussein Beyhum was known for his charitable deeds in Beirut and Lebanon, and the family also had relations with Prince Bashir Al-Shihabi. Omar Bey Beyhem was the head of the Shura Council during the era of Egyptian rule from 1831-1840. When Sheikh Saeed Jumblatt was imprisoned in Beirut in the wake of the events of 1860, Mustafa Effendi Beyhem took care of him in his prison.

His cultural and intellectual activity 
Muhammad Jamil Bayyuhum held many political and scientific positions, including: In 1916 he became honorary head of the Agricultural Bank branch in Beirut provinces. In 1905, he became a member of the Makassed Islamic Charitable Association in Beirut. In 1908 he became a member of the Islamic Charitable Society in Istanbul. In 1910 he was appointed a member of the Ottoman fleet management board. In 1915 he was appointed as a member of the Beirut Municipal Council. He was appointed as a deputy in the Arab government in 1919. He obtained a doctorate on the subject of the mandate over Syria and Iraq from the University of Paris in 1928 AD. He was also a member of the Syrian Reform Party defending the Arabic language and literature, a member of the Lebanese Scientific Academy in 1929 AD, and a member of the Iraqi Scientific Academy in 1939 AD, he also headed the Union of Parties Lebanese Anti-Zionist movement in 1944 AD. While he held the title of champion of women, as he was a permanent defender of her political and social rights. In 1933, Beyhem and his wife, Nazik al-Abed, founded the Association “Combating Prostitution”, defying the French Mandate authorities that encouraged the scourge of Prostitution in Lebanon by laws and regulations that were issued by them.

His implication

• Women in Modern Civilization (1927)

• Women in history and laws

• Women in Arab Civilization

• Palestine Andalusia of the East (1946)

• The philosophy of Ottoman history in two parts (1925 - 1954)

• The girl of the East in the civilization of the West

• Veteran era in Syria and Lebanon

• The Arabness of Lebanon

• Lebanon between East and West

• Political tendencies in Lebanon

• The two mandates in Iraq and Syria

• Arab convoys and processions through the ages, two parts

• The missing link in the history of the Arabs

Arabism and modern populism

• A modern free world

• Arab unity between the tides

• The firsts of the sultans of Turkey

• Arabs and Turks in the conflict between East and West 

• Washington paves the roads for Moscow in Arab and Muslim countries

• Secrets behind the curtain between the Soviet Union and the People's Republic of China

• The philosophy of the history of Muhammad (pbuh) 

• Study and analysis of the original Arab era 

• Women in Islam and Western Civilization

External links 

 Muhammad Jamil Beyhem The Anti-Woman and Palestine trilogy
 The historian Muhammad Jamil Beyhem (1887-1978) by Hassan Hallaq
 The greatest contemporary events (1900 - 2014 AD)

References 

Arab writers
Lebanese Arab nationalists
Lebanese politicians
Arab politicians
People from Beirut vilayet
People from Beirut
1887 births
1978 deaths